Zisman is a surname. Notable people with the surname include:

Emanuel Zisman (1935–2009), Israeli politician and ambassador
Julia Zisman (born 1961), Russian-born Israeli painter
William Zisman (1905–1986), American chemist and geophysicist

See also
Ziman